Jasper Avenue is an arterial road in central Edmonton, Alberta, and is the city's main street. Jasper Avenue has no official street number but is aligned with 101 Avenue with the majority of its length. Jasper Avenue is a major public transit route as several of Edmonton's busiest bus routes travel along it. The LRT travels underneath Jasper Avenue between 99 and 110 Streets. It is named after Jasper Hawes, manager of a North West Company trading post of Jasper House in the early 1800s, located in present-day Jasper National Park.

Route description 
Jasper Avenue begins at 125 Street in the community of Westmount as a local residential street. One block to the east, 124 Street turns east and becomes Jasper Avenue, which functions as its unofficial western terminus, with 102 Avenue taking over as the main east–west artery to west Edmonton. Jasper Avenue passes the community of Oliver through mixed retail and high density residential. East of 109 Street, Jasper Avenue passes through the downtown core and is home to many of Edmonton's oldest heritage buildings (for example the Hotel Macdonald) and some of Edmonton's tallest office towers, including Canadian Western Bank Place and Scotia Place. East of 97 Street, Jasper Avenue departs from both the downtown core and the 101 Avenue alignment, running northeast along the North Saskatchewan River valley through the community of Boyle Street. At 82 Street, the roadway turns north; however Jasper Avenue continues east as a local residential street through the community of Cromdale, ending at 77 Street. The Jasper West area (west of 97 Street) is one of the major retail, living, commercial, and entertainment districts of the city.

History

While slow reinvestment continued into the 2000s, the downtown core has recently seen increased development, such as the rise of the Warehouse District and Ice District to the north, resulting in increased activity and redevelopment along Jasper Avenue.

The original alignment of Highway 16 which entered Edmonton from the west along Stony Plain Road and 102 Avenue, followed Jasper Avenue between 124 Street and 95 Street, where it connected with Rowland Road and the Dawson Bridge, left Edmonton to the east along 101 Avenue. In the 1950s, Highway 16 was moved to 111 Avenue and 118 Avenue, resulting in the inner city route becoming Highway 16A. In the early 1980s, the Highway 16A designation along Jasper Avenue was phased out.

Neighbourhoods
List of neighbourhoods Jasper Avenue runs through, in order from west to east:
Westmount
Oliver
Downtown
Boyle Street
Cromdale

Major intersections
Starting at the west end of Jasper Avenue.

See also

 Downtown Edmonton
 List of avenues in Edmonton
 Transportation in Edmonton

References

External links
Experience Jasper Avenue - City of Edmonton - redesign Jasper Avenue between 109 Street and 124 Street

Roads in Edmonton
Shopping districts and streets in Canada